The Port of Prince Rupert is a seaport managed by the Prince Rupert Port Authority that occupies  of land and water along  of waterfront. The port is located in Prince Rupert Harbour in the North Coast Regional District of British Columbia.

The Port of Prince Rupert is the third busiest seaport in Canada by container volume and cargo tonnage after the Port of Vancouver and Port of Montreal.

History

Early 20th century
The Port of Prince Rupert was built upon the completion of the Grand Trunk Pacific Railway in 1914 and its development had been promoted by Grand Trunk Railway president Charles Melville Hays as an alternative to the Port of Vancouver, which was serviced by the Canadian Pacific and Canadian Northern railways. In 1919, the Grand Trunk Pacific fell into bankruptcy and was nationalized by the federal government and merged into the Canadian National Railways (CNR).

The port was expanded during World War II to support Canadian and United States military action in the Pacific Theatre, notably in the Alaska Territory.

Late 20th century
In 1975, the federal government declared the Port of Prince Rupert a "National Harbour", followed by several years of construction of various facilities such as the Fairview Terminal and Ridley Terminals. A 1989 expansion of the Fairview Terminal added a third berth and 6.5 ha of storage area. In 1989, 1,705 total vessels, including 468 deep sea vessels, with 11,332,000 tonnes of cargo move through the port.

Since 1982 Aquatrain barge carries rail cargo between Prince Rupert and Whittier, Alaska.

Conversion to an intermodal terminal
In April 2005, it was announced that the Fairview Terminal would be converted into an intermodal container shipping terminal, given Prince Rupert's advantages of having a location along the Pacific Great Circle Route between Asia and the west coast of North America; which makes it the first inbound and last outbound port of call, as well as having the deepest natural harbour depths on the continent. Because the port at Prince Rupert is closer to Asia on the Pacific Great Circle route, and with the city of Prince Rupert having less municipal congestion than other West Coast ports, additional rail infrastructure investments toward Canada's heartland should cut time from East Asian markets to North American destinations. Sea travel time to the West Coast, time in processing the containers in port, and the time in getting products to the Midwestern United States would be more efficient. The overall time from ports like Busan, Hong Kong, Kaohsiung, Shanghai, and Singapore in Asia and to eventual Midwest destinations like, Chicago, Detroit, Milwaukee, Minneapolis, and St. Louis, should see time and cost reductions.

On September 12, 2007, phase 1 the Fairview Terminal opened for business and received its first container ship (from COSCO) in October. Phase 1 has an annual container-handling capacity of only 500,000 TEUs. However Phase 2, planned to be completed late in 2010, will increase the Port of Prince Rupert's capacity to 2 million TEUs, and to 4 million TEUs by 2015, and there is extensive capacity for further expansion. This will provide much-needed relief to the congested west-coast ports of North America. The containerization of the Fairview Terminal is an important part of the Asia–Pacific Gateway and Corridor Initiative of the Government of Canada and the Pacific Gateway strategy of the Province of British Columbia.

The second phase expansion has been protested by some First Nations groups, saying that the PRPA failed to consult them. Another group in Delta is lobbying for the expansion of the Prince Rupert port in order that the port at Delta will not be expanded.

On January 23, 2013, federal Environment Minister Peter Kent approved the environmental assessment of the Phase 2 expansion of the terminal. However, there was no set time frame for the construction of Phase 2, as the decision is up to Maher Terminals to proceed. It was noted that the need for expansion does not yet exist as through operation efficiencies achieved by the design of the terminal and the workforce, the actual capacity of the terminal (750,000 TEUs) exceeds current demand.

In January 2015 there was a trade dispute when the State of Alaska had solicited for bids for a ferry terminal update. The project was seeking U.S. Federal funds which required that the project comply with the Buy America provision. The Canadian Government blocked the project and the state of Alaska canceled bids because a temporary solution could not be reached.

Governance
The Prince Rupert Port Authority was created on May 1, 1999 and succeeds the Prince Rupert Port Corporation (PRPC). Prince Rupert was among 8 national ports in Canada which implemented this administrative change on this date, as required by the Canada Marine Act which passed on June 11, 1998. PRPC was the successor to the National Harbours Board, which previously operated all federally owned ports in Canada.

PRPA reports to the Minister of Transport and has a Board of Directors typically consisting of local business and community figures. In the past, the appointment process to the boards of Canada's port authorities has been criticized as they have frequently been used for political patronage.

Facilities

PRPA port facilities include:
 Atlin Terminal
 Northlands Cruise Terminal
 Lightening Dock
 Ocean Dock
 Pinnacle Pellet Terminal
 Fairview Terminal
 Prince Rupert Grain
 Ridley Terminals
Westview Wood Pellet Terminal

All PRPA facilities are serviced by CN Rail.

With the completion of Phase 2, the port has a capacity of 2,000 kTEUs. For comparison, the Port of Vancouver handles 2,500 kTEUs of cargo.

Pacific Port Volumes 
Cargo handled expressed in the number of 20-foot-equivalent units (TEUs) and million metric tonnes (MMT). Statistics for American ports are excluded, because of inconsistencies among various web pages. The major differences may be due to the inclusion of empty containers shipped.

Funding for Container Terminal
The Canadian $170 million terminal project, with a design capacity of 500,000 TEUs (20-foot equivalent units) has been funded by five partners:
 Maher Terminals, $60 million, including the three super-post panamax cranes
 Government of Canada: Western Economic Diversification Canada, $30 million
 Province of British Columbia, $30 million
 CN Rail, $25 million towards the terminal's rail-related infrastructure
 Prince Rupert Port Authority, $25 million

See also
 Western Economic Diversification Canada

References

External links 

 International Shipping in British Columbia 
 Chamber of Shipping (BC): BC Ports handbook (pdf, 258 p.)

Port authorities in Canada
Ports and harbours of British Columbia
Transport in Prince Rupert, British Columbia